N,N-Diisopropylaminoethanol (DIPA) is a processor for production of various chemicals and also an intermediate in the production of the nerve agents VX and NX.  It is a colorless liquid, although aged samples can appear  yellow.

Health effects
Inhalation and skin contact are expected to be the primary ways of occupational exposure to this chemical. Based on single exposure animal tests, it is considered to be slightly toxic if swallowed or inhaled, moderately toxic if absorbed through skin as well as being corrosive to eyes and skin. Vapor may be irritating to the eyes and upper respiratory tract.  Temporary and reversible visual disturbances characterized by mildly blurred vision, a blue-gray discolorization of sight (blue haze) or halo vision (appearance of a halo when looking at light sources) may also occur.

References

Primary alcohols
Ethanolamines
Diisopropylamino compounds
Nerve agent precursors